Isometrus maculatus, commonly as the lesser brown scorpion, is a species of scorpion in the family Buthidae. Its distribution is pantropical; it is an introduced species in Hawaii.

Description
Total length is about 30 to 75 mm. Manus of pedipalp is very thin, whereas in males, its width equals that of patella and femur. Pedipalps and legs are yellow, with spots. Manus of pedipalps is yellow with many spots, but fingers are dark. Mesosomal segments are light colored. Basal middle lamella of female pecten is quadrangular shaped. Posterior margin of sternite V is straight in females, which is very slightly convex medially in males. There are 15 to 20 pectinal teeth, but Sri Lankan specimens recorded 17 to 20 pectinal teeth. Sexual dimorphism is visible after the last molt. Identification of immature males and females is difficult, but can be separated by observing pectines. Pectines are longer and larger in males than in females. Also, male pectines have more teeth than female pectines.

The duration of embryonic development ranges from 2.2 to 3.2 months. After a single insemination, adult female can gives birth to from three to five broods in captivity. Average littler size for a brood ranges from 14 to 21 juveniles. Young scorpions remain with their mother until their first molt. After the first moult, they start to disperse. The first molt took place about 5 days after the birth. Subsequent molts usually take place at different ages, on average 46, 78, 111 and 155 days. The duration of postembryonic development ranges from 4.5 to 5.6 months. Adult lifespan is about 24 to 35 months.

See also
Dwarf Wood Scorpion

References

External links

maculatus
Introduced animals of Hawaii
Scorpions of Australia